Splendrillia afflicta is an extinct species of sea snail, a marine gastropod mollusk in the family Drilliidae.

Distribution
This extinct marine species was endemic to New Zealand

References

 Maxwell, P.A. (2009). Cenozoic Mollusca. pp. 232–254 in Gordon, D.P. (ed.) New Zealand inventory of biodiversity. Volume one. Kingdom Animalia: Radiata, Lophotrochozoa, Deuterostomia. Canterbury University Press, Christchurch.

External links

afflicta
Gastropods of New Zealand